Ardeshir "Amir" Ghalenoei (born 21 November 1963 in Tehran, Iran) is an Iranian football coach and former player who currently manages Iran national football team. He has been the most successful coach in the Iran Pro League and managed several clubs, including Esteghlal, Mes Kerman, Sepahan S.C. and Tractor, with two of which he won a total of five championships and two Hazfi Cup titles. He was also the head coach of Iran national football team from August 2006 to July 2007 where he managed the team for the 2007 AFC Asian Cup where Iran was eliminated in the quarter-finals.

Club career

Rah Ahan
Ardeshir (Amir) Ghalenoei was born on 21 November 1963 in Tehran, Iran. His father, a taxi driver, died when Amir was only thirteen years old. He began his career in the late 1970s after passing a technical test for Rah Ahan, one of the oldest clubs in the Iranian football. He played for the club's youth team for two years and was promoted to the first team squad in 1981 by Nasser Ebrahimi. He had a good performance there and scored three goals during the domestic Tehran Hazfi cup. Ghalenoei left the club after the club's head coach signed for Shahin.

Shahin
When Ebrahimi became Shahin's coach, Ghalenoei moved to Shahin along with him. Shahin had several national players such as Nasrollah Abdollahi, Mehdi Dinvarzadeh, Hamid Majd Teymouri. Ebrahimi left the club in 1984, succeeded by Mehrab Shahrokhi who was the head coach for a short period before being replaced by Nasrollah Abdollahi. Ghalenoei became the club's captain after the retirement of Dinvarzadeh. During his time in Shahin, he helped the team to finish as runner-up in two Tehran leagues in 1985 and 1986.

He played his last match for Shahin in a 2–0 victory against Persepolis where both goals were on Ghalenoei's assists. He left the team in the middle of the 1987–88 season and signed with the Qatari club of Al-Sadd.

Al-Sadd
He signed a one-and-a-half years contract with Al-Sadd in 1987. He helped his side to two domestic league title and one Emir of Qatar (FA Cup) title. Al-Sadd also won 1988–89 edition of AFC Champions League in spring of 1989 after defeating Al-Rasheed in the final. However Ghalenoei had already left the club and returned to Iran, and thus was not a member of the Asian champions squad.

Esteghlal

He joined Esteghlal in July 1989 and played for the club until his retirement. He made his debut in a game against Persepolis in a quarter final Hazfi Cup match where he lost his penalty kick.

He won the Iran league title in his first full season (1989–90) at the club in spring 1990. Esteghlal also won the Asian Club Championship on the following season (1990–91) after nearly twenty years.

Ghalenoei lost most of the next season (1991–92) due to a heavy injury. At that season, Esteghlal could not obtain an entry to the next season (1992–93) of Azadegan league and thus was asked to play in the 3rd Division for one season. This meant the departure of many players like Ahmad Reza Abedzadeh, Shahrokh Bayani, Majid Namjoo-Motlagh, Samad Marfavi and Reza Ahadi but Ghalenoei remained at the team and was chosen as the club's new captain. Esteghlal again rose to the top level of Iranian football in 1994–95 and was ranked second on their first season back to the competition. Ghalenoei also scored twice in the final game of the following season (1995–96) Hazfi Cup. In his last season in Esteghlal, they started off successfully both in the Iranian and Asian Cup Winners' Cup, but could not sustain the good performance. Their head coach, Mansour Pourheidari – who had the club to the Asian glory – resigned mid season and Nasser Hejazi was appointed as the head coach and finished the league with sixth position. He retired at the end of this season after missing many matches due to injury.

He was the captain of Esteghlal in the last four years of his career, known as "General", a title bestowed on him by fans due to his outstanding skills in leading the team during his career as the club.

International career
He was first invited to Iran national B football team in 1985 by Nasser Ebrahimi, a coach that he began his career with. He was invited to Iran national football team again in 1993 by Ali Parvin and played against Bosnia and Herzegovina on 12 September 1993.

International goals

Managerial career

Esteghlal Ahvaz
After serving as the Esteghlal's interim head coach in 5 matches in spring 2002 and winning the Hazfi cup with this team, he was appointed as Esteghlal's assistant coach for the next season (2002–03). However, he left the team before the season started and joined Esteghlal Ahvaz in the 5th week of the 2002–03 league.

Esteghlal Tehran

He was officially named as Esteghlal's head coach before the 2003–04 season by the club chairman Mohammad Gharib. He succeeded Mansour Pourheidari who Ghalenoei was his assistant for the years. At the end of the season, Esteghlal lost the league after a defeat to Esteghlal Ahvaz, team Ghalenoei coached in 2002 in the final match.

Iranian national team
IRIFF appointed Ghalenoei as head coach of the Iran national football team on 17 July 2006 to succeed Branko Ivanković. After finishing first in the qualifying round 2 points ahead of South Korea and then finishing first in the group stage of the final tournament in Malaysia, Iran lost to South Korea in the penalty shoot-outs of the Quarters Final match and was eliminated from the 2007 Asian Cup. Ghalenoei was heavily criticized by the press. After a period of discussion in the Iranian football federation, his contract was not renewed and national team was left with a caretaker manager for several months.

Mes Kerman
Despite being in negotiations with Uzbek League champions FC Pakhtakor Tashkent on 1 January 2008, Ghalenoei signed a contract until the end of the 2007–08 season with Iran Pro League side Mes Kerman. where he led the club to finish among the top teams of the second half-season, even though it was at the bottom of the table when he accepted the job.

Sepahan
He signed for Sepahan in summer 2009. Where he won the Persian Gulf Cup for the second time in a row, but failed to qualify for last 16 in the AFC Champions League for the second time in the row.

Ghalenoei renewed his contract with Sepahan for the upcoming season, where he won the league for the third time in the row and second time with Sepahan. Sepahan had excellent performance in AFC Champions League as well and qualified for quarter final with five wins in seven matches. However, after that he left Sepahan on 4 June 2011 due to conflict with the new board director though he had led the club to the quarter finals of the AFC Champions League as the best team of the west Asian division.

Tractor

On 13 June 2011, he was named as new Tractor head coach.

Club statistics
These statistics include all formal club-level games since Ghalenoei started coaching at the highest division of Iran football in 2002: Iran Pro League, Hazfi Cup, and AFC Champions League.

As manager of Esteghlal

Iran National Team statistics

Honours

Player
Rahahan
Tehran Hazfi Cup: 1980 (Runner-up)

Shahin
Tehran League: 1985 (Runner-up), 1986 (Runner-up)

Esteghlal
Asian Club Championship (1): 1990–91, 1991–92 (Runner-up)
Iranian league (1): 1989–90, 1991–92 (Runner-up), 1994–95 (Runner-up)
Hazfi Cup (1): 1990–91 (Runner-up), 1995–96
Tehran league (1): 1989 (Runner-up), 1990 (Runner-up), 1991

Al-Sadd
Qatar League (1): 1987–88
Emir Cup (1): 1988

Manager
Esteghlal
Iranian league (3): 2003–04 (Runner-up), 2005–06, 2008–09, 2012–13
Hazfi Cup (2): 2001–02, 2003–04 (Runner-up), 2007–08

Sepahan
Iranian league (2): 2009–10, 2010–11, 2018–19 (Runner-up)

Tractor
Iranian league: 2011–12 (Runner-up)
Hazfi Cup: 2016–17 (Runner-up)

Zob Ahan
Iranian league: 2017–18 (Runner-up)

Individual
Asian Manager of the Year: 2007 (Runner-up)
Iranian Manager of the Year (5): 2006, 2010, 2011, 2013, 2018
Iran Football Federation Award coach of the season (1): 2012–13
Navad Manager of the Month (5): January 2018, April 2018, May 2018, September 2018, October 2018

References

External links

1963 births
Living people
People from Tehran
Iranian footballers
Esteghlal F.C. players
Esteghlal F.C. managers
Sepahan S.C. managers
Shahin FC players
Iranian football managers
Iran international footballers
Iran national football team managers
Sanat Mes Kerman F.C. managers
Al Sadd SC players
Gol Gohar Sirjan F.C. managers
Iranian expatriate footballers
2007 AFC Asian Cup managers
Tractor S.C. managers
Association football midfielders
Iranian restaurateurs
Qatar Stars League players
Footballers at the 1994 Asian Games
Asian Games competitors for Iran
Esteghlal Ahvaz F.C. managers
Persian Gulf Pro League managers